The Gârbova is a left tributary of the river Secaș in Romania. It discharges into the Secaș in Miercurea Sibiului.

References

Rivers of Romania
Rivers of Alba County
Rivers of Sibiu County